Dufour-Lapointe is a surname. Notable people with the surname include:

 Maxime Dufour-Lapointe (born 1989), Canadian Olympic freestyle skier
 Chloé Dufour-Lapointe (born 1991), Canadian Olympic freestyle skier
 Justine Dufour-Lapointe (born 1994), Canadian Olympic freestyle skier

See also 
 Dufour (surname)
 Lapointe (surname)

Compound surnames
French-language surnames
Surnames of French origin